Asobara is a genus of parasitoid wasps in the family Braconidae. The genus is best known for the Drosophila parasitoid Asobara tabida, which is notable as both a model for parasitoid wasp infection in insects, and also as a representative of the hologenome theory of evolution. Asobara tabida is commensally infected with Wolbachia, and cannot reproduce in the absence of Wolbachia infection. As such, the genome of Asobara is directly tied to the genome of its commensal Wolbachia symbiont, and the two are considered to have a hologenome.

References

Further reading

Rolff, J., and A. R. Kraaijeveld. "Host preference and survival in selected lines of a Drosophila parasitoid, Asobara tabida." Journal of Evolutionary Biology 14.5 (2001): 742–745.
Green, D. M., A. R. Kraaijeveld, and H. C. J. Godfray. "Evolutionary interactions between Drosophila melanogaster and its parasitoid Asobara tabida." Heredity85.5 (2000): 450–458.

External links

Braconidae genera